The Kirkjubøur stone (FR 1) is a runestone found in the Saint Olav's church in Kirkjubøur, Faroe Islands. It was discovered in 1832 and is dated to the Viking Age. Today it is housed at the Faroese National Museum (Føroya Fornminnissavn) in Tórshavn together with other Faroese runestones.

See also 

Sandavágur stone
Fámjin stone

Runestones on the Faroe Islands